Theodore Rosengarten (born December 17, 1944) is an American historian.

He graduated from Amherst College in 1966 with a BA, and earned his PhD from Harvard University with a dissertation on Ned Cobb (1885–1973), a former Alabama tenant farmer. Subsequently, he developed his interviews with Cobb as a kind of "autobiography", All God's Dangers: The Life of Nate Shaw (1974), which won the U.S. National Book Award in category Contemporary Affairs.

About fifteen years later, All God's Dangers: The Life of Nate Shaw was adapted and produced as a one-man play starring Cleavon Little at the Lamb's Theater in New York City.

Awards
 1989 MacArthur Fellows Program

Works
All God's Dangers: The Life of Nate Shaw, Knopf, 1974, 
Tombee: Portrait of a Cotton Planter, Authors Theodore Rosengarten, Thomas Benjamin Chaplin, Editor Susan W. Walker, Morrow, 1986, 
Land of Deepest Shade: Photographs of the South, authors Theodore Rosengarten, Photographs John McWilliams, High Museum of Art, 1989, 
"A Portion of the People: Three Hundred Years of Southern Jewish Life", Editors Theodore Rosengarten, Dale Rosengarten, University of South Carolina Press, 2002, 
Grass Roots: African Origins of an American Art, Authors Dale Rosengarten, Theodore Rosengarten, Enid Schildkrout, Judith Ann Carney, Museum for African Art, 2008,

References

External links
"The Hem of My Garment: An Interview with Theodore Rosengarten about the Making of "Nate Shaw"", George Abbott White and Theodore Rosengarten, The Massachusetts Review, Vol. 21, No. 4 (Winter, 1980), pp. 787–800

21st-century American historians
21st-century American male writers
Living people
1944 births
Harvard University alumni
MacArthur Fellows
National Book Award winners
Amherst College alumni
American male non-fiction writers